Elections for Boston Borough Council, which governs as a second-tier authority the Borough of Boston were held on Thursday 7 May 2015. Following Boundary Commission changes between this election and the previous in 2011 to the wards, 30 councillors were elected to serve 15 wards. The election was held on the same day as other local elections.

Composition of council seats before election
Immediately after the 2011 election, 19 councillors were Conservatives, 4 were Boston Bypass Independents, 4 were Independents, 3 were Labour and 2 were English Democrats.  In the four-year term 4 Boston Bypass Independents changed their alignment to Independent. Two Conservative councillors became independent or unaligned. One Conservative councillor died in office and a UKIP member won the subsequent by-election. One English Democrat-affiliated councillor was disqualified due to non-attendance and a UKIP-affiliated candidate won the consequent by-election. The two UKIP councillors late in the term defected to the Lincolnshire Independent Party.

Two councillors: unaligned sitting as independents not among original group of independents.

Candidates by party

Boston Borough Council has 15 wards with a total of 30 councillors (down from 18 wards and 32 councillors in 2011). In this election, there are a total of 83 candidates standing (a decrease of 12% from the 95 candidates in the last election in 2011).

Incumbent councillors consisted of Conservative, Labour members and eleven Independent councillors. Conservatives stood in all wards though not for every vacancy with a total of 26 candidates; Labour fielded 19 candidates in 12 wards, 15 Independents stood.

Of the other parties standing, UKIP fielded 18 candidates in 15 wards, the Green Party 4 candidates (across four) and one Liberal Democrat stood in Witham Ward.

Results

Ward-by-Ward

References

External links
2015 Elections - Statement of Persons Nominated

2015 English local elections
2015
2010s in Lincolnshire
May 2015 events in the United Kingdom